Miroslav Smíšek  (2 February 1925 – 19 May 2013) was a Czechoslovakian-born New Zealand potter.

Biography
Smíšek was born in the Bohemia region of Czechoslovakia in 1925. After spending most of World War II in labour camps due to his efforts in the anti-Nazi resistance movement, he fled Europe in 1948 after the Czech coup. He emigrated first to Australia, and then to New Zealand in 1951, and became a naturalised New Zealand citizen in 1955.

He worked for the Crown Lynn pottery in Auckland where he created the "Bohemia Ware" line in manganese slip glaze, before moving to Nelson in 1952.  There he worked at the Nelson Brick and Pipe Company, where he learned the technique of salt glazing. He left in 1957 and became New Zealand's first full-time studio potter. He also taught pottery at the Nelson Technical School (at the time part of Nelson College) and night classes at Waimea College. In 1962 he went to Japan and studied at Kyoto University. In 1963 he went to St Ives in England and studied under Bernard Leach. In 1968 he moved to the Kapiti Coast, where he established three potteries. Potter Pamella Annsouth became his partner in 1979 and remained with him until his death.

He worked extensively for The Lord of the Rings film trilogy, making about 700 earthenware items for the three films. Frequently he had to make two or three of each piece in different sizes to allow them to be used by the hobbits, humans and giants.

In the 1990 Queen's Birthday Honours, Smíšek was appointed an Officer of the Order of the British Empire, for services to pottery. He received the Gratis Agit award from the Czech government in 2011 for promoting the Czech Republic overseas.

Smíšek died in Wellington in 2013.

At the time of his death, a retrospective exhibition "60 Years 60 Pots" was touring New Zealand. 
A number of his pieces are held in the Museum of New Zealand Te Papa Tongarewa.

In 2020-2021 the two beehive kilns that Smíšek had built and used for some 40 years were directly in the path of the new Peka Peka to Otaki (PP2Ō) Expressway. Waka Kotahi the New Zealand Transport Agency agreed to preserve the kilns and carefully moved them to a nearby location. The move and refurbishment has been documented by local artist Elisabeth Vullings.  The Mirek Smisek Arts Trust is now developing plans to build an arts centre centred on the relocated kilns.

Further sources
 Jenny Pattrick, Neil Rowe, Mirek Smisek: Strength and Freedom, New Zealand Crafts 18, Spring 1986

References 

1925 births
2013 deaths
Czechoslovak emigrants to Australia
Australian emigrants to New Zealand
New Zealand potters
New Zealand Officers of the Order of the British Empire
Nelson College faculty
Naturalised citizens of New Zealand